The Wrong Woman is a 1995 Canadian thriller film directed by Douglas Jackson and starring Nancy McKeon, Chelsea Field, and Michele Scarabelli. It was produced by Pierre David and written by Douglas Soesbe.

Plot
An honest temporary employee (Nancy McKeon) finds herself accused of murder when the president of the real estate company to which she has been assigned is suddenly murdered before she can tell him that she discovered one of his regular workers has been robbing him blind. That she was having an affair with the slain man only complicates matters.

The film was broadcast on CBS March 26, 1996. Subsequently, it was released on video and is a frequent repeat on the Lifetime Network.

Cast
Nancy McKeon as Melanie Brooke
Michele Scarabelli as Christine Henley  
Chelsea Field as Margaret Bateman
Gary Hudson as Lt. Nagel  
Stephen Shellen as Tom Henley  
Lyman Ward as Jonah Slide

External links

 

1995 films
1996 television films
1996 films
1990s thriller films
Canadian thriller television films
English-language Canadian films
1990s English-language films
CBS network films
Films directed by Douglas Jackson
Republic Pictures films
1990s Canadian films